Jay Tessmer (born December 26, 1971 in Meadville, Pennsylvania), is a former relief pitcher for Major League Baseball's New York Yankees. Tessmer played baseball for eight years, nearly all of them spent with an affiliate of the Yankees. He retired after the 2002 season, where he saw the most of his action with the Yankees' AAA affiliate, the Columbus Clippers.

Early career 
Tessmer attended Cochranton High School in Cochranton, Pennsylvania, and would be accepted to the University of Miami, playing on their baseball team. He would play in the 1994 and 1995 College World Series for Miami, and was named Coral Gables Regional MVP. He was drafted in the nineteenth round by the Yankees in the 1995 MLB Draft, and began playing for the team's Single-A affiliate in Oneonta, New York, pitching 38.0 innings with two wins and a 0.95 ERA. The following season, he moved up to the Tampa Yankees and had a career-best 12-4 record and a 1.48 ERA. He also had 104 strikeouts, the highest total of his career.

Jay was inducted into the University of Miami Sports Hall of Fame at its 45th Annual Induction Banquet on Thursday, April 11, 2013.

Later career 
Tessmer was promoted to the AA Norwich Navigators for 1997, but struggled and fell to 3-6. He returned to Norwich the next year and after improving his ERA to 1.09, he was promoted to Triple A where it was boosted to 0.49. That season, he made his Major League debut against the Anaheim Angels, where he struck out two hitters. He ended his abbreviated Major League season with one win and a 3.12 ERA. In 1999, he had three wins and forty-two strikeouts at AAA, and again played briefly for the Yankees, posting a 14.85 ERA over six games. He struggled with his consistency in 2000, however, going 4-8.

Despite lowering his MLB ERA to 6.75, Tessmer was traded at the end of the season to the Colorado Rockies for David Lee. He played for the Rockies' AAA affiliate, and won one game, but had a 6-10 walks/strikeout ratio, and was traded again to the Milwaukee Brewers. Playing in Indianapolis, he threw 39 strikeouts and had a 4.37 ERA. His contract was not renewed, and he returned to the Yankees in 2002. He played two games in the majors, with a 6.75 ERA. He spent the rest of the year in AAA, winning five game and earning a 4.37 ERA. He would not return to professional baseball.

External links 
, or Retrosheet, or Pura Pelota (Venezuelan Winter League)

1971 births
Living people
Baseball players from Pennsylvania
Colorado Springs Sky Sox players
Columbus Clippers players
Indianapolis Indians players
Major League Baseball pitchers
Miami Hurricanes baseball players
New York Yankees players
Norwich Navigators players
Oneonta Yankees players
People from Meadville, Pennsylvania
Tampa Yankees players
Tiburones de La Guaira players
American expatriate baseball players in Venezuela
University of Miami alumni